Bernardo Grinspun (1925-1996) was the minister of economy of Raúl Alfonsín. He was appointed in 1983, and resigned in 1985.

References

Argentine Ministers of Finance
Radical Civic Union politicians
University of Buenos Aires alumni
1925 births
1996 deaths
Jewish economists
Argentine Jews